Waseem Hassan Abdullah Al-Bzoor is a retired Jordanian footballer who played as a defender for Shabab Al-Ordon and the Jordan national football team. He was the managing director and assistant coach of Jordan U-23. In 2018 he was the technical director of Shabab Alordon club youth section teams, and is now the Football Head coach of Shabab Al-Ordon senior team in the Jordanian pro league.

Personal life and family
Waseem is married and has four sons: Bisan, Zaid, Hassouneh, and Aboud.

International Goals

References
Al-Bzour Signs Up for Al-Faisaly (Amman) 
Al-Bzour Returns to Shabab Al-Ordon
https://www.facebook.com/284788738251337/photos/a.923556994374505/2466082626788593?type=3&sfns=mo
https://www.facebook.com/waseem.bzoor

External links

www.kooora.com 

1979 births
Living people
Association football defenders
Jordanian footballers
Jordan international footballers
Jordanian Pro League players
Jordanian Pro League managers
Shabab Al-Ordon Club managers
Al-Ramtha SC players
Shabab Al-Ordon Club players
Al-Faisaly SC players
That Ras Club players